Norman Abraham Haskell (1905-1970), was an American geophysicist

Starting his graduate work on measuring the viscosity of the mantle, Haskell made major contributions to geophysics over a career that lasted nearly 40 years.

Other of his contributions included the formulation of a matrix method for propagating waves in a layered medium and development of the simple mathematical description of earthquake sources that allows their durations to be studied using seismic waves. He also used seismology to monitor nuclear testing.

Family
He and his wife, Rose, had a son, Peter (1934-2010), who became an actor.

References

1905 births
1970 deaths
American geophysicists
American seismologists
People from Boston